The Ministry of Finance is a government ministry of the Bahamas responsible for the care and management of public finances. The development and management of the annual government budget is a major aspect of the ministry's function. Since 1984, Prime Minister of the Bahamas has mostly held the portfolio of Minister of Finance.

Ministers of Finance

See also
Government of the Bahamas
Central Bank of the Bahamas
Economy of the Bahamas
 Securities Commission of the Bahamas

References

Government of the Bahamas
Government ministries of the Bahamas
Economy of the Bahamas
Bahamas
1960s establishments in the Bahamas